Salem is a Dispersed Rural Community and unincorporated place in the municipality of Mono, Dufferin County in southwestern Ontario, Canada.

References

Communities in Dufferin County